"Elegia" is an instrumental composed and performed by the British rock band New Order. It was released on their third studio album, Low-Life (1985). The track was written and produced by Gillian Gilbert, Peter Hook, Stephen Morris and Bernard Sumner.

Elegia is an instrumental tribute to Joy Division frontman Ian Curtis, whom the members of New Order previously played in. Due to its somber mood, it has been used in a variety of media, including Pretty in Pink, Stranger Things and The Crown. Elegia is Greek for elegy.

Background 
Elegia was originally written for a film commissioned by i-D magazine and was inspired by Ennio Morricone's For A Few Dollars More score. The film was not completed, so the band saved the recording for their upcoming album.

Elegia was recorded at CTS Studios in Wembley in a single, 24-hour session with the working title ‘Ben and Justin’. It is in the key of A minor with a time signature of 12/8. The song uses the E-mu Emulator II for several sounds, including choir and strings.

17-minute version
The original recording of "Elegia" had a duration of 17:29 which was edited down to 4:56 for the album version on Low-Life. The full-length version was included on the limited five-disc version of the compilation album, Retro, as well as the 2008 Collector's Edition of Low-Life. The full version was also released on vinyl in 2012.

Use in media

 It was featured in the Academy Award-nominated short film More by Mark Osborne.
 It was used in the 1986 film Pretty in Pink.
 The trailer for the 1992 film Night of the Living Dead.
 The CSI: Crime Scene Investigation episode "Compulsion". 
 It was used in an American Masters documentary about writer Truman Capote.
 In the fifth episode of the first season of the Netflix series Stranger Things.
 Comedian Sam Hyde used it for the trailer to his web series "Kickstarter TV".
 "Rust" – a black-and-white music video by Nenko Genov.
 The E3 2015 trailer of the video game Metal Gear Solid V: The Phantom Pain. 
 The song is also used in the first episode of the show "Deadly Class (TV series)". 
 It is used in The Crown season 4 episode "The Heredity Principle".

References

New Order (band) songs
1985 songs
Songs written by Bernard Sumner
Songs written by Peter Hook
Songs written by Stephen Morris (musician)
Songs written by Gillian Gilbert